Edwin Apps (14 May 1931 – 16 April 2021) was an English television actor and writer. He appeared in many British and French television series and films, which include Whack-O!, I Thank a Fool, Danger Man, The Avengers, Steptoe and Son, My Wife Next Door, Special Branch, Katts and Dog, The Messenger: The Story of Joan of Arc, Vatel, Joséphine, ange gardien, 15 ans et demi and others.

He created and co-wrote the 1960s sitcom All Gas and Gaiters (1966–71) with his wife, actress Pauline Devaney. Their joint writing was sometimes credited to the pseudonym John Wraith.

Acting credits

Writing credits

References

External links

1931 births
2021 deaths
English male television actors
20th-century British writers
English male screenwriters
British male television actors
20th-century English male writers
People from Wingham, Kent